Ute Strompel is a retired East German slalom canoeist who competed in the early 1960s. She won a bronze medal in the K-1 event at the 1961 ICF Canoe Slalom World Championships in Hainsberg.

References

East German female canoeists
Living people
Year of birth missing (living people)
Medalists at the ICF Canoe Slalom World Championships